Oxford Street Mall is a shopping centre on Oxford Street in the Accra, Ghana neighborhood of Osu.

Closure
The Mall was closed down by Accra Metropolitan Assembly for lack of requisite occupancy certificate. It was however opened for business.

Facilities
The Mall has restaurants, anchor shops, cinemas, banks, casinos etc. Some its leading tenants include, MTN, Shoprite, Unibank etc. The Mall is yet to be fully completed with a 132-room hotel still under construction.

References 

Retail buildings in Ghana